Gepotidacin (INN) is an experimental antibiotic that acts as a topoisomerase type II inhibitor.  It is being studied for the treatment of uncomplicated urinary tract infection (acute cystitis) and infection with Neisseria gonorrhoeae (gonorrhea), including multidrug resistant strains.

References 

Antibiotics